Mikhail Vladimirovich Zhelanov (born 24 July 1964) is a Russian professional football functionary and a former player.

External links
 

1964 births
Sportspeople from Potsdam
Living people
Soviet footballers
Russian footballers
FC Torpedo Moscow players
FC Zimbru Chișinău players
Russian expatriate footballers
Russian expatriate sportspeople in Germany
Expatriate footballers in Moldova
FC Nyva Vinnytsia players
Expatriate footballers in Ukraine
FC Torpedo Miass players
PFC CSKA Moscow players
Association football forwards
Footballers from Brandenburg
FC Khimik Dzerzhinsk players
FC Znamya Truda Orekhovo-Zuyevo players